Laemanctus waltersi, also known commonly as Walters' casquehead iguana or Walters's casquehead iguana, is a species of lizard in the family Corytophanidae. The species is endemic to Honduras.

Etymology
The specific name, waltersi, is in honor of taxidermist Leon L. Walters, who collected the holotype with Karl Schmidt.

Geographic range
L. waltersi is found in northwestern Honduras.

Reproduction
L. waltersi is oviparous.

References

Further reading
McCoy CJ (1968). "A Review of the Genus Laemanctus (Reptilia: Iguanidae)". Copeia 1968 (4): 665–678. (Laemanctus longipes waltersi, new taxonomic status).
McCranie JR (2015). "A checklist of the amphibians and reptiles of Honduras, with additions, comments on taxonomy, some recent taxonomic decisions, and areas of further studies needed". Zootaxa 3931 (3): 352–386. (Laemanctus waltersi, new taxonomic status).
McCranie JR (2018). "The Lizards, Crocodiles, and Turtles of Honduras. Systematics, Distribution, and Conservation". Bulletin of the Museum of Comparative Zoology 15 (1): 1–129.

Laemanctus
Reptiles described in 1933
Taxa named by Karl Patterson Schmidt
Reptiles of Honduras